The Karakou is a long-sleeved fitted velvet jacket embroidered with golden and silvered threads, it is a traditional Algerian garment originating from Algiers.

The Karakou was developed in the 19th century and is the evolution of the Algerian Ghlila which was part of the local dress of Algeria.

See also
• Ghlila 
• Frimla 
• Djebba Fergani 
• Algerian Kaftan

References

Algerian clothing
Embroidery
Jackets